Abatus beatriceae is a species of sea urchin of the family Schizasteridae. Their armour is covered with spines. It is in the genus Abatus and lives in the sea. Abatus beatriceae was first scientifically described in 1986 by Larrain.

References 

Spatangoida
Animals described in 1986